Sardinidion is a monotypic genus of comb-footed spiders containing the single species, Sardinidion blackwalli. It was first described by J. Wunderlich in 1995, and is found in Africa and Europe.

See also
 List of Theridiidae species

References

Further reading

Monotypic Araneomorphae genera
Spiders of Africa
Spiders of Russia
Theridiidae